Paras Thermal Power Plant is oldest power plant in the WORLD located at Paras, Akola district of Maharashtra. The power plant is one of the [coal] based power plants of Mahagenco.

Power Plant
Paras Thermal Power Station is the oldest of all Mahagenco Power plants. The station has witnessed the third generation technology. The station had 30 MW installed capacity in 1961 with a stroke boiler. The same unit was abandoned in 1993 due to ageing.

Installed Capacity

Transport
It is on the Nagpur–Bhusawal section of Central Railway. Coal-based thermal power stations consume large quantities of coal. For example, the Paras Thermal Power Station consumed 351,000 tonnes of coal in 2006–07. Around 80 per cent of the domestic coal supplies in India are meant for coal based thermal power plants and coal transportation forms 42 per cent of the total freight earnings of Indian railways.

Famous Personalities
 Paras is home town of Mr. Shivdeep Lande(IPS) and Dr. Niyaz Ahmad(SCIENTIST).

References

Coal-fired power stations in Maharashtra
Akola district
Energy infrastructure completed in 1961
1961 establishments in Maharashtra
20th-century architecture in India